Škufče is a small settlement east of the village of Ravnik in the Municipality of Bloke in the Inner Carniola region of Slovenia.

References

External links

Škufče on Geopedia

Populated places in the Municipality of Bloke